The MT class were a group of coastal minesweepers built for the Soviet Navy in the 1943-1945. The Soviet designation was Project 253L.

Design
The specifications for the Project 253 were issued in April 1942 by admiral Lev Galler. Initial design iteration made by TsKB-32 was unsatisfactory and was transferred in 1943 to TsKB-51 for improvements, resulting in Project 253L (named after chief designer N. G. Loshchinskii). The minesweepers were badly needed in the heavily mined Baltic Sea, therefore pre-production series comprising 32 vessels were ordered 12 April 1943, followed by full-capacity production on two shipyards starting from 12 June 1943. The minesweeper was extremely successful, resulting in 4 shipyards assigned to its production starting from 31 October 1943.

Two main versions were produced:

MT-1 (June 1943) - full displacement 126.6 tons

The ships were routinely fitted with four mine-sweeping gears, comprising two mechanical trails, magnetic and acoustic towed trails.

Ships
A total of 92 ships were built, all to the Baltic fleet operation. Numbers were T-222 to T-249,  T-351 to T-391, T-434 to T-441, T-459 to T-479. Only T-387 was lost to enemy action been sunk by German submarine U-481 28 November 1944.

Upon retirement in 1956, the MT minesweepers were routinely converted into diving support ships.

See also
List of ships of the Soviet Navy
List of ships of Russia by project number

References

External links
MT type minesweeper - type description and vessels list
Soviet navy minesweepers: Минно-тральные корабли
List of Soviet navy minesweepers: Cоветское оружие времен Второй Мировой Войны Тральщики
Stalin's Ocean-going Fleet: Soviet Naval Strategy and Shipbuilding Programs

Mine warfare vessel classes
Minesweepers of the Soviet Navy
 
Ships of the Polish Navy